Recreation is a short comedy film written, directed by, and starring Charlie Chaplin. It was released on 13 August 1914.

Synopsis
The Tramp is despondent and prepares to drown himself in a park's lake. He quickly changes his mind when an attractive girl appears, and proceeds to flirt with her. However, her sailor boyfriend discovers this and starts a fight with the Tramp. Shortly thereafter two policemen become involved in the fight. The film ends with everyone falling into the lake.

Chaplin was the only actor in Recreation to receive a screen credit.

The film was only half a reel in length. A travel short, The Yosemite, made up the other half of the reel.

Cast
 Charlie Chaplin - The Tramp
 Charles Bennett -  Sailor (uncredited) 
 Helen Carruthers -  Girl (uncredited) 
 Edwin Frazee -  Short cop (uncredited)

See also
List of American films of 1914
Charlie Chaplin filmography

External links

 

1914 films
1914 comedy films
Silent American comedy films
American black-and-white films
American silent short films
Short films directed by Charlie Chaplin
Keystone Studios films
Films produced by Mack Sennett
1914 short films
Articles containing video clips
American comedy short films
1910s American films